Sri Sri Athkheliya Namghar or Sri Sri Athkhelia Namghar is a prominent pilgrimage place of Assam and North Eastern India. It is located at Bosa Gaon, Golaghat, Assam where the three rivers - Ghiladhari, Matrang and Kakodonga meet. It was constructed by king Gada Pani in the year 1681 AD. Before 1970s, temple was called Sri Sri Athkheliya temple but later, it was renamed as the Sri Sri Athkheliya Namghar due to the influence of Vaishnavism.

Etymology
Sri Sri Athkheliya is named after the eight kuris or "neighbourhoods" or "parts". As the people of these eight kuris together have formed a society and have carried out religious works together there, the place received the name of Sri Sri Athkhelia Namghar. According to Axom buronji or "the history of Assam", the Ahom kings, leaving those who knew systematic farming, to engage in expansion based farming, started the paik system. The groups above the paiks were called khels. Some such royal persons, or post-holders settled in neighbourhoods: the name of the khels were decided upon the 'post' of the post-holder.

Before 1970, Sri Sri Athkheliya Namghar was known as Sri Sri Athkhelia Hori Mandir. Even now on its entrance, the inscription reads "Sri Sri Athkheliya Hori Mandir". After 1970, it was renamed as the Sri Sri Athkheliya Namghar.

History
The definite answer to when and how the Sri Sri Athkhelia Namghar was made is unknown. According to Edward Gait's 'History of Assam', the Kachari kingdom's extended from the river Kalang to the river Dikhou. In the year 1600, the area went under the Kacharis. So, according to that, a Kachari king established a Hori Mandir or Shiva temple at the place to worship. In the buronji too, the foundation of any namghar at that place is not mentioned. Moreover Gadapani is not known to be too fond of Vaishnavism. Perhaps due to some natural calamity, the temple got destructed. And the place turned into a forest. According to folk sources, the temple reappeared after rituals conducted by a sage. As people got attracted, worship restarted. Also, an idol of Shiva has been found in a tea garden, about 5 to 7 km away. According to experts, it was made in the 9th century, i.e. before the arrival of the Ahoms.

According to tales, the land of the Sri Sri Athkhelia Namghar was once an ashram of some unknown kulasheel sage.

After Swargadeo Loraroja, illegally ascended to the throne of the Ahom empire, Gadapani Kowar or Godadhor Singha, in disguise, roamed at the hills. Once he saw the ashram and stayed there for a few days. It is said that the soldiers of loraroja, in search of Gadapani reached there, but as there were too many trees, and the path was full of spider-webs, they didn't expect to find any human there and went back. When Gadapani came out, he saw footprints and realised that the soldiers came searching him. The sage once told Gadapani, that he will become the king. Gadapani too, promised that if that happens, he will make the sage his minister. Time passed, and in 1681 AD, Gadapani became the king. Gadapani sent his men to search for the sage, so that he fulfills his promise. But nobody ever found the sage again. No one knows what happened to the sage. But, Gadapani gave the duty of taking care of the ashram to eight paik families nearby the ashram. As time passed by, the families turned into kuris, and as the eight kuris were associated with the holy place, the name became Athkuriya and later on Athkheliya.

With time, that mandir or temple turned into a namghar, due to the influence of Vaishnavism.

Location
Sri Sri Athkheliya Namghar is located at Bosa Gaon, Ghiladhari, Golaghat, Assam. The place is about 18 km away from Golaghat city. Starting their journey from the Naga hills, the three rivers join at a place very nearby the Sri Sri Athkheliya Namghar. The Matrang river meets northward flowing Ghiladhari river and finally both join the Kakodonga river nearby.

Transportation
Airway
Jorhat Airport lies about 60 km away from the centre.

Railway
The Forkating railway station is about 12.8 km away from the centre.

Road
Golaghat is well connected by roads from all parts of Assam. Golaghat city is about 20 km away from the centre and it takes about 40 minutes by bus to reach Sri Sri Athkhelia namghar from Golaghat city.

References

Golaghat district
Ekasarana Dharma
Krishna temples
Hindu pilgrimage sites in India
Buildings and structures in Assam
Tourist attractions in Assam
Cultural history of Assam